The 9th Vuelta a España (Tour of Spain), a long-distance bicycle stage race and one of the three grand tours, was held from 17 August to 10 September 1950. Rodríguez also won the mountains classification.

Teams and riders

Route

Results

Final General Classification

References

 
1950
1950 in Spanish sport
1950 in road cycling